Joseph Dooley may refer to:
Joseph Brannon Dooley (1889–1967), United States federal judge
Joe Dooley (basketball) (born 1966), basketball player 
Joe Dooley (born 1963), Irish hurling manager and former player
Joe Dooley (St Rynagh's hurler) (?–2014), Irish hurler